Atasthalistis is a genus of moths in the family Gelechiidae.

Species
Atasthalistis hieropla Meyrick, 1919
Atasthalistis ochreoviridella (Pagenstecher, 1900)
Atasthalistis pyrocosma Meyrick, 1886
Atasthalistis tricolor (Felder & Rogenhofer, 1875)

References

Dichomeridinae
Moth genera